Werner Plattner (born 31 January 1926) is an Austrian former fencer. He competed in the individual and team sabre events at the 1948 and 1952 Summer Olympics.

References

External links
  

1926 births
Possibly living people
Austrian male fencers
Austrian sabre fencers
Olympic fencers of Austria
Fencers at the 1948 Summer Olympics
Fencers at the 1952 Summer Olympics